Balageri is a village in Dharwad district of Karnataka, India.

Demographics 
As of the 2011 Census of India there was 1 household in Balageri and a total population of 4 consisting of 3 males and 1 female. There were no children ages 0-6.

References

Villages in Dharwad district